Tortricodes alternella is a species of moth of the family Tortricidae. It is found in most of Europe, except most of the Balkan Peninsula.

The wingspan is 19–23 mm. It slim moth, the forewings are quite narrow, grey or brown with a darker cross-band, occasionally the entire outer part is darker. The hindwings are pale brown with darker veins. It is similar to the male of Exapate congelatella, but flies in the spring, not in autumn.

Adults are on wing from February and April.

The larvae feed on various trees and bushes, including Quercus and Carpinus species. They spin together the leaves of their host plant and feed within.

Taxonomy
Tortricodes violella is treated as a valid species by some authors.

References

Moths described in 1775
Cnephasiini
Moths of Europe